The 1974 Scottish Cup Final was played on 4 May 1974 at Hampden Park in Glasgow and was the final of the 89th Scottish Cup. Celtic and Dundee United contested the match, Celtic won the match 3–0 with goals from Harry Hood, Steve Murray and Dixie Deans.

The game was Celtic's sixth successive appearance in the final, and Dundee United's first cup final appearance. It was Celtic's 23rd Scottish cup.

In a poor game Celtic rarely looked troubled by the young Dundee United team who appeared nervous in their first cup final appearance.  Though United's Doug Houston put a couple of early chances wide, after that Celtic had the bulk of the play and once Harry Hood scored in the 20th minute the result never looked in doubt.

Final

Teams

External links
SFA report

References

1974
Cup Final
Scottish Cup Final 1974
Scottish Cup Final 1974
1970s in Glasgow
May 1974 sports events in the United Kingdom